Ofer Talker ( born April 22, 1973) is a former Israeli football defender and now works as a manager.

Early years
Talker was born in Ashdod, Israel, to a family of Indian-Jewish heritage.

Club career
Talker began playing for the youth group of Maccabi Ironi Ashdod until 1988 when he moved to the elder team. In 1993, he moved to Hapoel Haifa, where he won the Israeli Premier League and the Toto Cup.  In the middle of the 2002 season, he moved to Beitar Jerusalem, where he played for four years.

At the end of 2005 Talker moved to Maccabi Netanya and in 2006 to Hapoel Kfar Saba, where he remained until his retirement in 2009.

Coaching career
On 23 May 2011, Talker was appointed as the manager of Maccabi Herzliya. He left the club in November 2012.

On 11 February 2013, Talker was appointed as the manager of Beitar Tel Aviv Ramla. He worked as the manager of Beitar until the end of that season.

In January 2014 he worked as the manager of Sektzia Nes Tziona.

On January 28, 2015, Ofer was appointed as the manager of Hapoel Nazareth Illit. He was sacked from the club on December 26, 2015, and a day later was rehired.

Honours

As a Player
Israeli Premier League (1):
1998-99
Toto Cup (1):
2000-01

As a Manager
Israeli Noar Leumit League (1):
2010-11

References

External links

1973 births
Living people
Israeli Jews
Israeli footballers
Footballers from Ashdod
Maccabi Ironi Ashdod F.C. players
Hapoel Haifa F.C. players
Beitar Jerusalem F.C. players
Maccabi Netanya F.C. players
Hapoel Kfar Saba F.C. players
Israel international footballers
Association football defenders
Israeli football managers
Maccabi Herzliya F.C. managers
Beitar Tel Aviv Bat Yam F.C. managers
Sektzia Ness Ziona F.C. managers
Hapoel Nof HaGalil F.C. managers
Liga Leumit players
Israeli Premier League players
Israeli people of Indian-Jewish descent